Tisamenus deplanatus is a stick insect species native to the Philippine islands Luzon and Mindanao occurs.

Taxonomy 
In 1845 John Obadiah Westwood first described the species as Phasma (Pachymorpha) deplanatum and transferred it to the genus Acanthoderus in 1859. A female is deposited as holotype in the Natural History Museum, London. In 1875 Carl Stål transferred the species as Tisamenus deplanatus to the genus he established Tisamenus. In 1939 the genus Tisamenus was synonymized with the genus Hoploclonia, whereby the species as Hoploclonia deplanata. At the same time the genus Hoploclonia was divided into different groups according to morphological aspects. In the so-called Deplanata group, they placed with Hoploclonia deplanata, Hoploclonia cervicornis (today Tisamenus cervicornis), Hoploclonia armadillo (today Tisamenus armadillo), Hoploclonia spadix (today Tisamenus spadix), Hoploclonia tagalog (today Tisamenus tagalog) and Hoploclonia fratercula (today Tisamenus fratercula), relatively unspined species, with a flat upper surface, which except for the supra coxal spines on the edges of the thorax show almost no spines, but at most teeth. In 2004 the Filipino species were transferred back to the genus Tisamenus and only those occurring on Borneo were left in the genus Hoploclonia, the species was called Tisamenus deplanata. In 2018 the ending of the species name was changed and since then the species is again referred to as Tisamenus deplanatus as in 1875 by Stål.

After similar specimens became known from Ilocos, which were later identified as Tisamenus fratercula, it was briefly discussed whether both species are conspecific. In 2021, a study based on genetic analysis that included samples of both species shows that they are not conspecific and not as closely related as the 1939 grouping suggested.

Description 
Tisamenus deplanatus is a squat, relatively unspined Tisamenus species with a flat top. On the flat head there is a distinct pair of supra orbital spines, which either consist of three interconnected tubercles or of a larger pair of tubercles with surrounding tubercles. On the right and left of the pronotum there are two closely spaced spines. On the relatively short mesothorax, which widens in a strongly trapezoidal shape towards the rear, there is the triangle formed by raised edges, which is typical of Tisamenus species. The base of this triangle is attached to the front edge of the mesonotum and is strongly raised. As an extension of the posterior tip of the triangle, a longitudinal ridge extends over the posterior two thirds of the mesonotum and the entire metanotum. In similar species, the triangle on the mesothorax is significantly longer, in Tisamenus fratercula about half as long as the mesonotum. In Tisamenus deplanatus it is almost equilateral and thus hardly reaches a third of the length of the mesonotum. On the lateral edges of the thorax there is only a pair of supra coxal spines formed as double spines at the widest point on the posterior edge of the metanotum. On the first three segments of the abdomen there are clear, on the fourth a barely visible pair of spines. The formation and arrangement of the spines is relatively the same in both sexes. In the case of the slimmer males, the relatively short and almost cylindrical abdomen is particularly noticeable. That of the females is almost as wide at the base as the metathorax at its widest point and tapers evenly to the tip of the secondary ovipositor.

Reproduction 
The females begin to lay eggs four to five weeks after moulting to imago. It takes the males about five months and the females six to seven months to become adult.

Distribution area 
The previously known distribution area includes the islands of Luzon and Mindanao. On Luzon, the stock currently held in Europe, among others, was found in the Pocdol Mountains. A female deposited in the National Museum of Natural History comes from Mindanao and was examined by Rehn and Rehn in 1939 for their work. Its place of discovery is only indicated with Surigao. Only the islands of the Philippines are named as the place where the female holotype was found.

In captivity 
Thierry Heitzmann first collected the species in October 2009 in southern Luzon in the Pocdol Mountains, where he found it on Mount Pulog. He was able to find more specimens on Mount Osiao the following month. He also found the previously unknown males of the species. After successfully breeding the species, he distributed it to other breeders. In Europe it was first bred in 2012 by Bruno Kneubühler and distributed by him. The Phasmid Study Group lists it under PSG number 399. It is very easy to keep and breed. Leaves of bramble or other Rosaceae are eaten, as well as cherry laurel, Gaultheria shallon (Salal) and hazel.

Gallery

References

External links

Phasmatodea
Phasmatodea of Asia
Insects described in 1848